Joan Lorring (born Madeline Ellis; April 17, 1926 – May 30, 2014) was an American actress and singer known for her work in film and theatre. For her role as Bessy Watty in The Corn Is Green (1945), Lorring was nominated for the Academy Award for Best Supporting Actress. Lorring also originated the role of Marie Buckholder in Come Back, Little Sheba on Broadway in 1950, for which she won a Donaldson Award (an early version of the Tony Award).

Early years
Lorring was born in Hong Kong. Her family fled Hong Kong in 1937 following the Japanese invasion in 1937 at the start of World War II, traveling by boat to Honolulu, and then landing in San Francisco.  Soon after, they moved to Los Angeles and Madeleine (known by her nickname "Dellie") began working as a child actress in radio and film – she was credited as "Dellie Ellis" when she played the title role in the radio program  A Date With Judy (1942).  She eventually adopted Joan Lorring as her stage name.

Radio
Lorring began her career as a child actress on the radio. Her performances include Alma Horrell in the Suspense episode "The Great Horrell", aired on August 22, 1946, and "The Farmer Takes a Wife".

Theatre
Lorring made her Broadway debut in 1950, originating the role of Marie Buckholder opposite Shirley Booth in Come Back Little Sheba. Terry Moore later played Marie in the 1952 film version. For this role, Lorring won a Donaldson Award for Most Outstanding Female Debut in the 1949–1950 Broadway season. This success led to her performing in the 1951 Broadway production of the Lillian Hellman play The Autumn Garden. In 1954, she performed in the play Dead Pidgeons, and her last Broadway appearance was in 1957, originating the role of The Young Woman, opposite Kim Stanley as The Woman, in A Clearing in the Woods by Arthur Laurents.

In 1970, Lorring performed in an Off-Broadway production of Awake and Sing! as Bessie Berger.

Film and television

Lorring made her film debut at age 18 in Song of Russia (1944). Her second film was the Oscar-nominated drama The Bridge of San Luis Rey.

For her third film role as Bessy Watty in 1945's The Corn Is Green opposite Bette Davis as Miss Moffat, Lorring (at age 19) was nominated for the Academy Award for Best Supporting Actress. Thelma Schnee had originated the role of Bessy on Broadway opposite Ethel Barrymore in 1940.

Lorring next had supporting roles in the 1946 dramas Three Strangers and The Verdict, in which she plays Lottie Rawson and performs the song "Give Me a Little Bit". In 1947, she appeared in The Other Love, a drama that stars Barbara Stanwyck, and in The Lost Moment which stars Susan Hayward. In 1948, she played a supporting role in Good Sam, which stars Gary Cooper and was directed by Leo McCarey.

In the early 1950s, Lorring began appearing often on television. In 1955, she performed in 13 episodes of the television series Norby as Helen Norby. The show lasted one season. Also in 1956, she reprised her award-winning role as  Bessy in The Corn is Green on television opposite Eva Le Gallienne as Miss Moffat. She appeared on one episode of Alfred Hitchcock Presents, (The Older Sister, 1956) about Lizzie Borden, in which she portrayed her sister Emma.

Lorring performed infrequently in the 1960s and 1970s focusing on her family life. Her last film role came in 1974 with The Midnight Man, and her later television roles were guest-starring for several episodes as Anna Pavel in Ryan's Hope and a 1980 episode of The Love Boat.

Personal life 
Loring was married to cancer researcher and Professor of Medicine and Professor of Biochemistry at Cornell Medical School, and Chief of Endocrinology at Memorial Sloan Kettering Cancer Center, Martin Sonenberg. The couple had two daughters, Santha and Andrea.

Retirement and death
Lorring enjoyed a quiet retirement through the 1980s and 1990s. She lived until May 30, 2014, when she died in Sleepy Hollow, New York at age 88 from natural causes. Lorring was not included in the In-Memoriam segment at the 87th Academy Awards.

Filmography

Radio appearances

References

External links
 
 
 

1926 births
2014 deaths
20th-century American actresses
American child actresses
American film actresses
American people of Russian-Jewish descent
American radio actresses
American stage actresses
American television actresses
Donaldson Award winners
Hong Kong emigrants to the United States
Jewish American actresses
21st-century American Jews
21st-century American women